Arnau Brugués-Davi and Malek Jaziri were the defending champions but decided not to participate.
Konstantin Kravchuk and Nikolaus Moser won the title, defeating Yuki Bhambri and Divij Sharan 6–7(5–7), 6–3, [10–7] in the final.

Seeds

Draw

Draw

References
 Main Draw
 Qualifying Draw

Penza Cup - Doubles
2012 Doubles
2012 in Russian tennis